Graham Township may refer to one of the following places:

In Canada
Graham Township, Sudbury District, Ontario

In the United States 

Graham Township, Jefferson County, Indiana
Graham Township, Johnson County, Iowa
Graham Township, Graham County, Kansas
Graham Township, Carter County, Oklahoma
Graham Township, Benton County, Minnesota
and also Graham Lakes Township, Nobles County, Minnesota
Township 6, Graham, Alamance County, North Carolina
Graham Township,  Clearfield County, Pennsylvania

See also
Graham (disambiguation)

Township name disambiguation pages